Nurul Majid Mahmud Humayun (born 16 December 1950) is a Bangladesh Awami League politician and the incumbent member of parliament from Narsingdi-4, the constituency encompasses Belabo and Manohardi upazilas. In January 2019, he has been selected as the Minister of Industries.

Early life
Humayun was born on 16 December 1950. He graduated with a M.M.S and law degree from University of Dhaka, Bangladesh.

Career
Humayun was elected to parliament from Narsingdi-4 in 2008 and 2014 as a candidate of the Bangladesh Awami League. He was the chairperson of the Parliamentary Standing Committee on Ministry of Commerce (Bangladesh) and the ex-chairperson of the Parliamentary Standing Committee on Expatriates’ Welfare and Overseas Employment. In November 2017, he was part of Bangladesh Awami League delegation to China.

References

1950 births
Living people
Awami League politicians
9th Jatiya Sangsad members
10th Jatiya Sangsad members
11th Jatiya Sangsad members
Industries ministers of Bangladesh